Multiple chemical sensitivity (MCS), also known as idiopathic environmental intolerances (IEI), is an unrecognized and controversial diagnosis characterized by chronic symptoms attributed to exposure to low levels of commonly used chemicals. Symptoms are typically vague and non-specific. They may include fatigue, headaches, nausea, and dizziness.

Although these symptoms can be debilitating, MCS is not recognized as an organic, chemical-caused illness by the World Health Organization, American Medical Association, nor any of several other professional medical organizations. Blinded clinical trials show that people with MCS react as often and as strongly to placebos as they do to chemical stimuli; the existence and severity of symptoms is seemingly related to the perception that a chemical stimulus is present.

Commonly attributed substances include scented products (e.g. perfumes), pesticides, plastics, synthetic fabrics, smoke, petroleum products, and paint fumes.

Symptoms 
Symptoms are typically vague and non-specific, such as fatigue or headaches.  These symptoms, although they can be disabling, are called non-specific because they are not associated with any single specific medical condition.

A 2010 review of MCS literature said that the following symptoms, in this order, were the most reported in the condition: headache, fatigue, confusion, depression, shortness of breath, arthralgia, myalgia, nausea, dizziness, memory problems, gastrointestinal symptoms, respiratory symptoms.

Symptoms mainly arise from the autonomic nervous system (such as nausea or dizziness) or have psychiatric or psychological aspects (such as difficulty concentrating).

Possible causes 
Various different causes for MCS have been hypothesized.

There is a general agreement among most MCS researchers that the cause is not specifically related to sensitivity to chemicals, but this does not preclude the possibility that symptoms are caused by other known or unknown factors. Various health care professionals and government agencies are working on giving those who report the symptoms proper care while searching for a cause.

In 2017, a Canadian government Task Force on Environmental Health said that there had been very little rigorous peer-reviewed research into MCS and almost a complete lack of funding for such research in North America. "Most recently," it said, "some peer-reviewed clinical research has emerged from centres in Italy, Denmark and Japan suggesting that there are fundamental neurobiologic, metabolic, and genetic susceptibility factors that underlie ES/MCS."

The US Occupational Safety and Health Administration (OSHA) says that MCS is highly controversial and that there is insufficient scientific evidence to explain the relationship between any of the suggested causes of MCS – it lists "allergy, dysfunction of the immune system, neurobiological sensitization, and various psychological theories" as the suggested causes – and its symptoms.

Immunological 
Researchers have studied immunity biomarkers in people with MCS to determine whether MCS could be an autoimmune disorder or allergic response, but the results have been inconclusive. Some people with MCS appear to have excess production of inflammatory cytokines, but this phenomenon is not specific to MCS and overall there is no evidence that low-level chemical exposure causes an immune response.

Genetic 
It has been hypothesized that there is a heritable genetic trait which pre-disposes people to be hypersensitive to low-level chemical exposure and so develop MCS. To investigate, researchers compared the genetic makeup of people with MCS, to people without. The results were generally inconclusive and contradictory, thus failing to support the hypothesis.

Gaétan Carrier and colleagues write that the genetic hypothesis appears implausible when the evidence around it is judged by the Bradford Hill criteria.

Psychological 

Several mechanisms for a psychological etiology of the condition have been proposed, including theories based on misdiagnoses of an underlying mental illness, stress, or classical conditioning. Many people with MCS also meet the criteria for major depressive disorder or anxiety disorder. Other proposed explanations include somatic symptom disorder, panic disorder, migraine, chronic fatigue syndrome, or fibromyalgia and brain fog. Through behavioral conditioning, it has been proposed that people with MCS may develop real, but unintentionally psychologically produced, symptoms, such as anticipatory nausea, when they encounter certain odors or other perceived triggers. It has also been proposed in one study that individuals may have a tendency to "catastrophically misinterpret benign physical symptoms"  or simply have a disturbingly acute sense of smell. The personality trait absorption, in which individuals are predisposed to becoming deeply immersed in sensory experiences, may be stronger in individuals reporting symptoms of MCS.  In the 1990s, behaviors exhibited by MCS sufferers were hypothesized by some to reflect broader sociological fears about industrial pollution and broader societal trends of technophobia and chemophobia.

These theories have attracted criticism.

In Canada, in 2017, following a three-year government inquiry into environmental illness, it was recommended that a public statement be made by the health department.

A 2018 systematic review concluded that the evidence suggests that abnormalities in sensory processing pathways combined with peculiar personality traits best explains this condition.

Diagnosis 
In practice, diagnosis relies entirely upon the self-reported claim that symptoms are triggered by exposure to various substances.

Many other tests have been promoted by various people over the years, including testing of the immune system, porphyrin metabolism, provocation-neutralization testing, autoantibodies, the Epstein–Barr virus, testing for evidence of exposure to pesticides or heavy metals, and challenges involving exposure to chemicals, foods, or inhalants.  None of these tests correlate with MCS symptoms, and none are useful for diagnosing MCS.

The stress and anxiety experienced by people reporting MCS symptoms are significant.  Neuropsychological assessments do not find differences between people reporting MCS symptoms and other people in areas such as verbal learning, memory functioning, or psychomotor performance.  Neuropsychological tests are sensitive but not specific, and they identify differences that may be caused by unrelated medical, neurological, or neuropsychological conditions.

Another major goal for diagnostic work is to identify and treat any other medical conditions the person may have.  People reporting MCS-like symptoms may have other health issues, ranging from common conditions, such as depression or asthma, to less common circumstances, such a documented chemical exposure during a work accident.  These other conditions may or may not have any relationship to MCS symptoms, but they should be diagnosed and treated appropriately, whenever the patient history, physical examination, or routine medical tests indicates their presence.  The differential diagnosis list includes solvent exposure, occupational asthma, and allergies.

Definitions 
Different researchers and proponents use different definitions, which complicates research and can affect diagnosis.  For example, the 1987 definition that requires symptoms to begin suddenly after an identifiable, documented exposure to a chemical, but the 1996 definition by the WHO/ICPS says that the cause can be anything, including other medical conditions or psychological factors.

In 1996, an expert panel at WHO/ICPS was set up to examine MCS. The panel accepted the existence of "a disease of unclear pathogenesis", rejected the claim that MCS was caused by chemical exposure, and proposed these three diagnostic requirements for what they re-named idiopathic environmental intolerances (IEI):

 the disease was acquired (not present from birth) and must produce multiple relapsing symptoms;
the symptoms must be closely related to "multiple environmental influences, which are well tolerated by the majority of the population"; and
it could not be explained by any other medical condition.
In Japan, MCS is called chemical hypersensitivity or chemical intolerance (化学物質過敏症; kagaku bushitsu kabinsho), and the 1999 Japanese definition requires one or more of four major symptoms – headaches; malaise and fatigue; muscle pain; joint pain – combined with laboratory findings and/or some minor symptoms, such as mental effects or skin conditions.  The defined lab findings are abnormalities in parasympathetic nerves, cerebral cortical dysfunction diagnosed by SPECT testing, visuospatial abnormalities, abnormalities of eye movement, or a positive provocation test.

International Statistical Classification of Diseases 
The International Statistical Classification of Diseases and Related Health Problems (ICD), maintained by the World Health Organization, is a medical coding system used for medical billing and statistical purposes – not for deciding whether any person is sick, or whether any collection of symptoms constitutes a single disease.  The ICD does not list MCS as a discrete disease.  However, this does not mean that people with MCS-related symptoms cannot be treated or billed for medical services.  For example, the public health service in Germany permits healthcare providers to bill for MCS-related medical services under the ICD-10 code T78.4, which is for idiosyncratic reactions, classified under the heading T78, Unerwünschte Nebenwirkungen, anderenorts nicht klassifiziert ("adverse reactions, not otherwise specified").  Being able to get paid for medical services and collect statistics about unspecified, idiosyncratic reactions does not mean that MCS is recognized as a specific disease or that any particular cause has been defined by the German government.  Healthcare providers can also bill for MCS-related services under the ICD-10 codes of F45.0 for somatization disorder.  MCS is named in evidence-based ("S3") guidelines for the management of patients with nonspecific, functional, and somatoform physical symptoms.

Management
There is no single proven treatment for MCS. The goal of treatment is to improve quality of life, with fewer distressing symptoms and the ability to maintain employment and social relationships, rather than to produce a permanent cure.

A multidisciplinary treatment approach is recommended.  It should take into account the uncommon personality traits often seen in affected individuals and physiological abnormalities in sensory pathways and the limbic system. There is also no scientific consensus on supportive therapies for MCS, "but the literature agrees on the need for patients with MCS to avoid the specific substances that trigger reactions for them and also on the avoidance of xenobiotics in general, to prevent further sensitization."

Common self-care strategies include avoiding exposure to known triggers and emotional self-care.  Healthcare providers can provide useful education on the body's natural ability to eliminate and excrete toxins on its own and support positive self-care efforts.  Avoiding triggers, such as by removing smelly cleaning products from the home, can reduce symptoms and increase the person's sense of being able to reclaim a reasonably normal life.  However, for other people with MCS, their efforts to avoid suspected triggers will backfire, and instead produce harmful emotional side effects that interfere with the overall goal of reducing distress and disability. Treatments that have not been scientifically validated, such as detoxification, have been used by MCS patients. Unproven treatments can be expensive, may cause side effects, and may be counterproductive.

Epidemiology 
Prevalence rates for MCS vary according to the diagnostic criteria used. The condition is reported across industrialized countries and it affects women more than men.

In 2018, the same researchers reported that the prevalence rate of diagnosed MCS had increased by more than 300% and self-reported chemical sensitivity by more than 200% in the previous decade. They found that 12.8% of those surveyed reported medically diagnosed MCS and 25.9% reported having chemical sensitivities.

A 2014 study by the Canadian Ministry of Health estimated, based on its survey, that 0.9% of Canadian males and 3.3% of Canadian females had a diagnosis of MCS by a health professional.

While a 2018 study at the University of Melbourne found that 6.5% of Australian adults reported having a medical diagnosis of MCS and that 18.9 per cent reported having adverse reactions to multiple chemicals. The study also found that for 55.4% of those with MCS, the symptoms triggered by chemical exposures could be disabling.

Gulf War syndrome
Symptoms attributed to Gulf War syndrome are similar to those reported for MCS, including headache, fatigue, muscle stiffness, joint pain, inability to concentrate, sleep problems, and gastrointestinal issues.

A population-based, cross-sectional epidemiological study involving American veterans of the Gulf War, non-Gulf War veterans, and non-deployed reservists enlisted both during Gulf War era and outside the Gulf War era concluded the prevalence of MCS-type symptoms in Gulf War veterans was somewhat higher than in non-Gulf War veterans. After adjusting for potentially confounding factors (age, sex, and military training), there was a robust association between individuals with MCS-type symptoms and psychiatric treatment (either therapy or medication) before deployment and, therefore, before any possible deployment-connected chemical exposures.

The odds of reporting MCS or chronic multiple-symptom illness was 3.5 times greater for Gulf War veterans than non-Gulf veterans. Gulf War veterans have an increased rate of being diagnosed with multiple-symptom conditions compared to military personnel deployed to other conflicts.

Prognosis 
About half of those who claim to be affected by MCS get better over the course of several years, while about half continue to experience distressing symptoms.

History 
MCS was first proposed as a distinct disease by Theron G. Randolph in 1950. In 1965, Randolph founded the Society for Clinical Ecology as an organization to promote his ideas about symptoms reported by his patients. As a consequence of his insistence upon his own, non-standard definition of allergy and his unusual theories about how the immune system and toxins affect people, the ideas he promoted were widely rejected, and clinical ecology emerged as a non-recognized medical specialty.

Since the 1950s, many hypotheses have been advanced for the science surrounding multiple chemical sensitivity.

In the 1990s, an association was noted with chronic fatigue syndrome, fibromyalgia, and Gulf War syndrome.

In 1994, the AMA, American Lung Association, US EPA and the US Consumer Product Safety Commission published a booklet on indoor air pollution that discusses MCS, among other issues. The booklet further states that a pathogenesis of MCS has not been definitively proven, and that symptoms that have been self-diagnosed by a patient as related to MCS could actually be related to allergies or have a psychological basis, and recommends that physicians should counsel patients seeking relief from their symptoms that they may benefit from consultation with specialists in these fields.

In 1995, an Interagency Workgroup on Multiple Chemical Sensitivity was formed under the supervision of the Environmental Health Policy Committee within the United States Department of Health and Human Services to examine the body of research that had been conducted on MCS to that date. The work group included representatives from the Centers for Disease Control and Prevention, United States Environmental Protection Agency, United States Department of Energy, Agency for Toxic Substances and Disease Registry, and the National Institutes of Health. The Predecisional Draft document generated by the workgroup in 1998 recommended additional research in the basic epidemiology of MCS, the performance of case-comparison and challenge studies, and the development of a case definition for MCS. However, the workgroup also concluded that it was unlikely that MCS would receive extensive financial resources from federal agencies because of budgetary constraints and the allocation of funds to other, extensively overlapping syndromes with unknown cause, such as chronic fatigue syndrome, fibromyalgia, and Gulf War syndrome. The Environmental Health Policy Committee is currently inactive, and the workgroup document has not been finalized.

The different understandings of MCS over the years have also resulted in different proposals for names.  For example, in 1996 the International Programme on Chemical Safety proposed calling it idiopathic environmental illness, because of their belief that chemical exposure may not the sole cause, while another researcher, whose definition includes people with allergies and acute poisoning, calls it chemical sensitivity.

See also
 Electromagnetic hypersensitivity
 Sick building syndrome
 Sensory processing disorder
 Sensory processing sensitivity
 List of questionable diseases
 Environmental health
 Environmental medicine
 Indoor air quality
 Sense of smell#Disorders

References

External links 
 Multiple Chemical Sensitivity Syndrome at the Merck Manual Professional Edition

Alternative diagnoses
Ailments of unknown cause
Sensitivities